"Cry for Help" is a 1991 single by Rick Astley.

Cry for Help may also refer to:

Films
Cry for Help (film), a 1928 German silent drama
A Cry for Help (1912 film), an American silent drama directed by D.W. Griffith
A Cry for Help (1975 film), a TV movie with Robert Culp
A Cry for Help: The Tracey Thurman Story, a 1989 NBC TV movie based on the 1985 ruling Thurman v. City of Torrington

Television
"Cry for Help" (Steven Universe), a 2015 episode of the American animated television series Steven Universe
"Cry for Help", Season 2, Episode 12 of Daktari, 1966
"Cry for Help", Season 8, Episode 13 of Quincy M.E., 1983
"Cry for Help", Season 5, Episode 14 of Combat!, 1966
"Cry for Help", Season 1, Episode 7 of 24-Hour Call, 1963
"Cry for Help", Season 2, Episode 4 of Casualty, 1987
"Cry for Help", Season 2, Episode 4 of General Hospital, 1975
"A Cry for Help", Season 3, Episode 8 of Emergency-Ward 10, 1967
"A Cry for Help", Season 1, Episode 10 of Stalker, 2014 
"A Cry for Help", a 2013 episode of The Ricki Lake Show
"A Cry for Help, Season 1, Episode 1 of Sutherland's Law, 1973
"A Cry for Help", Season 1, Episode 5 of Call 911, 2008
"A Cry for Help", Season 2, Episode 2 of Honey, We're Killing the Kids, 2007
"A Cry for Help", Season 1, Episode 4 of A Bunch of Fives, 1977
"A Cry for Help" (Upstairs, Downstairs), Season 1, Episode 6 of Upstairs, Downstairs, 1971
"A Cry for Help", Season 1, Episode 8 of Dr. G: Medical Examiner, 2005
"The Cry for Help", Season 14, Episode 5 of Horizon, 1977 
"A Cry for Help", Season 2, Episode 1 of Toad Patrol, 2003
"A Cry for Help", Season 2, Episode 21 of Cagney & Lacey, 1983
"A Cry for Help", Season 1, Episode 4 of The Lonelyheart Kid, 1984
"A Cry for Help", Season 2, Episode 9 of T.J. Hooker, 1982
"A Cry for Help", Season 7, Episode 10 of 7th Heaven, 2002 
"A Cry for Help", Season 1, Episode 4 of Jason of Star Command, 1978
"A Cry for Help", Season 7, Episode 21 of No Hiding Place, 1965

Music
"Cry for Help" (HomeTown song), a 2015 single by HomeTown
Cry for Help (EP), a 2012 EP by Bonfire
Cry for Help (album), a 1982 album by Super Heroines
Cry 4 Help, a 2019 EP by Kari Faux